Taker Bazar High School has been established in the year of 2013 at Taker Bazar. Taker Bazar is a market that stand at 16 no. Kadirpur union under Begumganj Upazila in Noakhali District.

References
 Taker Bazar High School

Begumganj Upazila
Schools in Noakhali District